There Are No Saints is a 2022 Mexican-American action thriller film directed by Alfonso Pineda Ulloa, and starring José María Yazpik, Paz Vega, Ron Perlman and Tim Roth.

Cast
José María Yazpik as Neto Niente
Ron Perlman as Sans
Shannyn Sossamon as Inez
Paz Vega as Nadia
Tim Roth as Carl Abrahams
Keidrich Sellati as Julio Niente
Neal McDonough as Vincent

Production
The project, originally titled The Jesuit, was first announced in 2010 with Paul Schrader also directing. Willem Dafoe, Michelle Rodriguez, Paz Vega and Manolo Cardona were set to star. In 2012, Alfonso Pineda Ulloa replaced Schrader as a director and some actors were replaced. The film has been completed since 2014.

Release
The film was released in theaters and on VOD on May 27, 2022.

Reception

Mark Hanson of Slant Magazine awarded the film two and a half stars out of four and wrote, "At its best, Alfonso Pineda Ulloa’s film gleefully embodies the grungy spirit of classic exploitation cinema."

Julian Roman of MovieWeb gave the film a positive review and wrote, "Famed screenwriter Paul Schrader goes ultra gritty in a bloody actioner that savages the innocent.(...)The narrative suffers from generic action tropes; but gets a pass for its brutal characters and willingness to defy convention."

Josh Bell of Comic Book Resources gave the film a negative review and wrote that it's "full of the hallmarks of a movie that's been extensively retooled in post-production..."

References

External links
 
 

2022 films
2022 action thriller films
American action thriller films
Films scored by Heitor Pereira
Films with screenplays by Paul Schrader
2020s English-language films
2020s American films